Constantin I. Istrati (7 September 1850 – 17 January 1919) was a Romanian chemist and physician. He was president of the Romanian Academy between 1913 and 1916.

He was born in 1850 in Roman, Moldavia (now in Neamț County, Romania). He studied at the Academia Mihăileană in Iași, after which he went to Bucharest to study at the University of Medicine and Pharmacy, graduating in 1869, and obtaining his M.D. in 1877.  After collaborating with Carol Davila, Istrati  pursued his studies for three years at the University of Paris, where he obtained in 1885 a Ph.D. in Chemistry under the direction of Charles Adolphe Wurtz and Charles Friedel, with thesis On colored ethylbenzene and some observations about boiling points in the aromatic series.

In 1883 he was named Professor of Physics at the School of Bridges and Roads in Bucharest, replacing Emanoil Bacaloglu. On April 1, 1889,  Istrati was elected corresponding member of the Romanian Academy.  Istrati later became a professor at the University of Bucharest, where he introduced the teaching of organic chemistry.

He served as Minister of Public Works in the first government of Gheorghe Grigore Cantacuzino (April 11, 1899 to January 9, 1900), and as Minister of Agriculture, Industry, Trade and Domains in the second Cantacuzino government (February 26 to March 12, 1907).

Istrati died in Paris in 1919.  He is buried at Bellu Cemetery in Bucharest; next to his tomb there is a bust of him, designed by the sculptor Raffaello Romanelli.

Bibliography 
 , 1962-1964

References

1850 births
1919 deaths
People from Roman, Romania
Carol Davila University of Medicine and Pharmacy alumni
University of Paris alumni
Academic staff of the Politehnica University of Bucharest
Academic staff of the University of Bucharest
Presidents of the Romanian Academy
Romanian chemists
19th-century Romanian physicians
20th-century Romanian physicians
Romanian Ministers of Culture
Romanian Ministers of Education
Romanian Ministers of Public Works
Romanian Ministers of Industry and Commerce
Burials at Bellu Cemetery